Prashant Kumar Ghosh (22 December 1927 – 25 December 2013)  was an Indian politician . He was a Member of Parliament, representing Ranchi, Bihar in the Lok Sabha the lower house of India's Parliament as a member of the Indian National Congress. He was student of St. Xavier's College, Ranchi and St. Columba's College, Hazaribagh.

References

External links
Official biographical sketch in Parliament of India website

Lok Sabha members from Bihar
Indian National Congress politicians
2013 deaths
1927 births
People from Ranchi
India MPs 1962–1967